A killing jar (or killing bottle) is a device used by entomologists to kill captured insects quickly and with minimum damage. The jar, typically glass, must be hermetically sealable and one design has a thin layer of hardened plaster of Paris on the bottom to absorb the killing agent. The killing agent will then slowly evaporate, allowing the jar to be used many times before needing to refresh the jar. The absorbent plaster of Paris layer also helps prevent the agent sticking to and damaging insects. Crumpled paper tissue is also placed in the jar for the same reason. A second method utilises a wad of cotton or other absorbent material placed in the bottom of the jar. Liquid killing agent is then added until the absorbent material is nearly saturated. A piece of stiff paper or cardboard cut to fit the inside of the jar tightly is then pressed in.

The most common killing agents are ether, chloroform and ethyl acetate. Ethyl acetate has many advantages and is very widely used. Its fumes are less toxic to humans than those of the other agents and specimens will remain limp if they are left in an ethyl acetate killing jar for several days and the ethyl acetate is not allowed to entirely evaporate from the specimens. It also preserves the body colors of some insects such as dragonflies that would otherwise lose their color, especially if there is a liquid layer to saturate their body tissues. A disadvantage is that although the  insects are quickly stunned by ethyl acetate it kills them slowly and specimens may revive if removed from the killing jar too soon. Isopropyl alcohol is an easy to find and use killing agent for amateurs. Potassium cyanide or other cyanide compounds including calcium cyanide are also used, but only by experts due to its extreme toxicity. It also has the disadvantages of making the specimens brittle when left in the jar for several hours and may also cause some discoloration of colored specimens. It does kill rapidly and the cyanide charge will last a long time. A few drops of acetic acid will increase the cyanide gas production.  If the jar is not used for long periods it may dry out and produce little gas, therefore a few drops of water will also help get the process going again. The potassium cyanide slowly decomposes, releasing hydrogen cyanide. In former times, amateur entomologists commonly used the thick green leaves of the Cherry Laurel (Prunus laurocerasus or Prunus caroliniana) which, crushed or finely sliced, will similarly release hydrogen cyanide.

Killing jars are only used on hard-bodied insects. Soft-bodied insects, such as the larval stage, are generally fixed in ethanol at 70–80% concentration.

See also
Insect collecting
Container glass

References

External links 
 Collecting and Preserving Insects and Mites: Tools and Techniques 
How to Collect and Prepare Forest Insect and Disease Organisms and Plant Specimens for Identification
A.Tereshkin Killing Jar with pieces of rubber tube for absorption of chloroform.

Entomology equipment
Animal killing
Glass jars